Saunders County is a county in the U.S. state of Nebraska. As of the 2010 United States Census, the population was 22,278. Its county seat is Wahoo.

Saunders County is included in the Omaha–Council Bluffs metropolitan area.

In the Nebraska license plate system, Saunders County is represented by the prefix 6 (the county had the sixth-largest number of vehicles registered in the state when the license plate system was established in 1922).

History
Saunders County was established by an 1856 act of the Nebraska Territorial Legislature, and was organized in 1866; its boundaries were redefined in 1858. It was originally named Calhoun County after John Calhoun, surveyor general of Kansas and Nebraska. Other sources contend that it was named for John C. Calhoun of South Carolina. In 1862, during the American Civil War, it was renamed after Nebraska territorial governor Alvin Saunders.

Geography
Saunders County is bordered on the north and east by the Platte River. Several local drainages move runoff water from the county eastward into the Platte. The county terrain is composed of low rolling hills, which  slope eastward and northeastward to the river valley.

Major highways

  U.S. Highway 6
  U.S. Highway 77
  Nebraska Highway 64
  Nebraska Highway 66
  Nebraska Highway 79
  Nebraska Highway 92
  Nebraska Highway 109

Adjacent counties

 Douglas County – east
 Sarpy County – east
 Cass County – southeast
 Lancaster County – south
 Butler County – west
 Dodge County – north

Protected areas

 Bramble State Wildlife Management Area
 Czechland Lake Recreation and Wildlife Management Area
 Jack Sinn Memorial State Wildlife Management Area
 Memphis Lake State Recreation Area
 Pioneer State Recreation Area

Demographics

As of the 2010 United States Census, there were 20,778 people and 8,040 households.  The population density was 28 people per square mile (10.7/km2). There were 9,221 housing units at an average density of 12.3 per square mile (4.75/km2). The racial makeup of the county was 98.2% White, 0.6% Black or African American, 0.6% Native American, 0.6% Asian, 0.00% Pacific Islander, 1.0% from other races, and 1.1% from two or more races. 2.0% of the population were Hispanic or Latino of any race.

As of the 2000 United States Census, there were 19,830 people, 7,498 households, and 5,443 families in the county. The population density was 26 people per square mile (10/km2). There were 8,266 housing units at an average density of 11 per square mile (4/km2). The racial makeup of the county was 98.49% White, 0.11% Black or African American, 0.29% Native American, 0.22% Asian, 0.01% Pacific Islander, 0.35% from other races, and 0.55% from two or more races. 1.03% of the population were Hispanic or Latino of any race.

There were 7,498 households, out of which 34.20% had children under the age of 18 living with them, 62.60% were married couples living together, 6.70% had a female householder with no husband present, and 27.40% were non-families. 23.60% of all households were made up of individuals, and 11.90% had someone living alone who was 65 years of age or older. The average household size was 2.61 and the average family size was 3.11.

The county population contained 27.90% under the age of 18, 6.30% from 18 to 24, 27.60% from 25 to 44, 22.90% from 45 to 64, and 15.30% who were 65 years of age or older. The median age was 38 years. For every 100 females there were 99.10 males. For every 100 females age 18 and over, there were 98.10 males.

The median income for a household in the county was $42,173, and the median income for a family was $49,443. Males had a median income of $33,309 versus $22,922 for females. The per capita income for the county was $18,392. About 5.30% of families and 6.60% of the population were below the poverty line, including 7.30% of those under age 18 and 7.00% of those age 65 or over.

Communities

Cities
 Ashland
 Wahoo (county seat)
 Yutan

Villages

 Cedar Bluffs
 Ceresco
 Colon
 Ithaca
 Leshara
 Malmo
 Mead
 Memphis
 Morse Bluff
 Prague
 Valparaiso
 Weston

Census-designated place
 Wann

Townships

 Ashland
 Bohemia
 Center
 Chapman
 Chester
 Clear Creek
 Douglas
 Elk
 Green
 Leshara
 Marble
 Marietta
 Mariposa
 Morse Bluff
 Newman
 North Cedar
 Oak Creek
 Pohocco
 Richland
 Rock Creek
 South Cedar
 Stocking
 Union
 Wahoo

Politics
Saunders County voters tend to vote Republican. In only two national elections since 1936 has the county selected the Democratic Party candidate (as of 2020)

See also
 National Register of Historic Places listings in Saunders County, Nebraska

References

External links
 Saunders County (by Nebraska Rural Web)
 Saunders County Government (website)
 Mead and Hunt. (2003) Nebraska Historic Buildings Survey: Saunders County. Nebraska State Historical Society. Retrieved 8/30/07.

 
1866 establishments in Nebraska Territory
Populated places established in 1866